Marian Quartly (born 1942) is an Australian social historian. She is professor emeritus in history at Monash University.

Early life and education 
Marian Quartly is the daughter of Valma Jean (née Tyler) and metalworker Gordon Henry Quartly. She was born in 1942 in Adelaide, South Australia. She attended Blair Athol State School and then Wilderness School. In 1964 she completed a BA (Hons) at the University of Adelaide. She moved to Melbourne, where she graduated with a PhD at Monash University in 1970.

Career 

Quartly's teaching career began at Universiti Sains Malaysia where she lectured in historical method and Malay history. In 1975 she was appointed an Australian history tutor at the University of Western Australia. From there she moved to Monash University as a lecturer in 1980 and remained there until she retired in 2006, being appointed professor emeritus. During her time at Monash she was Dean of Arts from 1994 to 1999.

In 1994, she was awarded the Human Rights Non-Fiction Award for Creating a Nation jointly with co-authors Patricia Grimshaw, Marilyn Lake and Ann McGrath.

Marian Quartly Prize 
In 2018 the Australian Historical Association (AHA) renamed its Taylor and Francis Prize the Marian Quartly Prize in recognition of Quartly's contribution as inaugural editor of its journal, History Australia. The prize is awarded for the best journal article published each calendar year.

Winners include:

 2017: Laura Rademaker (then the Taylor and Francis Prize)
 2018: Ben Silverstein
 2019: Frances Steel
 2020: Jeremy Martens
 2021: Jordana Silverstein
 2022: Nancy Cushing

Works

As author

As editor

As contributor

References 

1942 births
Living people
Australian women historians
University of Adelaide alumni
Monash University alumni
Academic staff of Monash University